Animal Vehicle is the third studio album by Australian comedy band The Axis of Awesome, released on 12 July 2011.

Track listing

Personnel
Jordan Raskopoulos – vocals
Lee Naimo – guitar, vocals
Benny Davis – keyboards, vocals

References

2011 albums
The Axis of Awesome albums